This is a list of Israel's ambassadors to Albania. The ambassador is based in Tirana, the Albanian capital. The current ambassador is Noah Gal Gendler, who has held his position since 2019.

List of Ambassadors
Aviezer Pazner (Non-Resident, Rome) 1991 - 1995
Yehuda Millo (Non-Resident, Rome) 1995 - 2001
Ehud Gol (Non-Resident, Rome) 2001 - 2004
Irit Ben-Abba (Non-Resident, Jerusalem) 2004 - 2006
Amira Arnon (Non-Resident, Jerusalem) 2007 - 2009
David Cohen (diplomat) 2012 - 2015
Boaz Rodkin 2015 - 2019
Noah Gal Gendler 2019–present

References

Albania
Israel